Pogonopygia pavida is a species of moth of the  family Geometridae. It is found in the Himalaya, Taiwan, Japan, Indonesia and Peninsular Malaysia.

Subspecies
Pogonopygia pavida pavida
Pogonopygia pavida baria Prout, 1932 (Borneo)
Pogonopygia pavida contaminata Inoue, 1971 (Japan)
Pogonopygia pavida xanthura Prout, 1928 (Sumatra, Peninsular Malaysia)

References

Moths described in 1911
Boarmiini
Moths of Japan